Pan Yan (born 22 September 1973) is a Chinese former synchronized swimmer who competed in the 1996 Summer Olympics.

References

1973 births
Living people
Chinese synchronized swimmers
Olympic synchronized swimmers of China
Synchronized swimmers at the 1996 Summer Olympics
Synchronized swimmers from Tianjin